Edward Elgar's Cello Concerto received its first complete recording in 1928. A truncated version had been recorded under the composer's supervision, using the acoustic recording process, but it was not until the introduction of electrical recording in the mid-1920s that large orchestral works of this kind could be adequately put on disc. All the recordings up to 1963 were monaural. The first stereophonic studio recording, by Jacqueline du Pré, the London Symphony Orchestra and Sir John Barbirolli, has remained in the catalogues continuously since its first release, and is still used by many as a touchstone.

Recordings by date

Critical opinion
The BBC Radio 3 feature "Building a Library" has presented comparative reviews of all available versions of the concerto on three occasions, and recommended as follows:
11 February 1984, reviewer, Michael Kennedy:
Jacqueline du Pré (1965)
27 April 1991, reviewer, Jerrold Northrop Moore:
Julian Lloyd Webber
Steven Isserlis
Beatrice Harrison
Paul Tortelier (1998)
14 February 2004, reviewer, Richard Morrison:
Jacqueline du Pré (1965)
 Truls Mørk (1999)
Yo-Yo Ma

The Penguin Guide to Recorded Classical Music, 2008, gave its maximum four star rating to the 1965 du Pré/Barbirolli recording of the concerto. It awarded three stars (representing "an outstanding performance and recording") to the recordings by Casals, Gastinel, Harrell, Harrison, Isserlis, Ma, Mørk, Noras, Rostropovich (1964), Schiff (2006), Thedéen, and Tortelier (1972, studio).

Notes

References
March, Ivan (ed). The Penguin Guide to Recorded Classical Music 2008, Penguin Books, London, 2007. 

Discographies of classical compositions
Cello Concerto discography